BVQ or bvq may refer to:

 BVQ, the Indian Railways station code for Bhilawadi railway station, Maharashtra, India
 bvq, the ISO 639-3 code for Birri language, Central African Republic